Connecting is an American television sitcom.

Connecting may also refer to:
 Connecting, a book by Larry Crabb
 Connecting Railway, a subsidiary of Pennsylvania Railroad

See also 
 
 Connect (disambiguation)
 Connector (disambiguation)
 Connection (disambiguation)
 Connective (disambiguation)